Skourletis is a Greek surname. It is the surname of:

 Konstantinos Skourletis (died 1888), Greek politician and mayor of Patras.
 Panos Skourletis (born 1962), Greek politician and Minister of Labour.

Greek-language surnames
Surnames